This is a list of electoral results for the Electoral district of Hannans in Western Australian state elections.

Members for Hannans

Election results

Elections in the 1950s

Elections in the 1940s

Elections in the 1930s

|- style="background-color:#E9E9E9"
! colspan="6" style="text-align:left;" |After distribution of preferences

 Preferences were not distributed to completion.

Elections in the 1920s

Elections in the 1910s

Elections in the 1900s

References

Western Australian state electoral results by district